Tracey Slaughter (born 1972) is a New Zealand writer and poet.

Life 
Slaughter was born in Papatoetoe, South Auckland, and lived there until she was 10 years old, when her family moved to the Coromandel Peninsula. She studied at the University of Auckland, graduating with a Ph.D in 2002. The title of her PhD thesis was Her face looking back at me: reflections on New Zealand women's autobiography. Slaughter has tutored in English at Massey University and the University of Auckland, and is a lecturer in creative writing at the University of Waikato.

Slaughter's writing includes short stories, poems and novels, and focus on relationships and life in New Zealand. Her characters often experience trauma, such as suicide, cancer or infidelity.

Slaughter has won the Bank of New Zealand Katherine Mansfield Award twice, in 2001 and 2004. In 2014, she won the Bridport Short Story Award for scenes of a long-term nature. Slaughter was shortlisted for the Manchester Poetry Prize in 2014, and the Manchester Short Story Prize in 2015 for ‘Stage Three’. Also in 2015, she won the Landfall Essay Competition for her non-fiction work ‘Ashdown Place’.

Publications 

 her body rises (Random House, 2005) 
 the longest drink in town (Pania Press, 2015)
 deleted scenes for lovers (Victoria University Press, 2016)

References

Living people
1972 births
University of Auckland alumni
Academic staff of the University of Waikato
People from Auckland
New Zealand women poets
New Zealand women short story writers
New Zealand women novelists
New Zealand women academics